Cross Keys is the name of several places in the U.S. state of Pennsylvania, including:

 Cross Keys, Adams County, Pennsylvania, an unincorporated community
 Cross Keys, Blair County, Pennsylvania, a census-designated place